The National Comedy Awards (known as the British Comedy Awards from 1990 to 2014) is an annual awards ceremony in the United Kingdom, celebrating notable comedians and entertainment performances of the previous year.

The British Comedy Awards (1990–2014)

The awards were shown live on ITV in December from 1990 to 2006, after which the broadcast of the British Comedy Awards 2007 was suspended by ITV due to allegations of irregularities and deception in the awarding of the 2005 People's Choice Award and then ongoing related investigations about the 2007 British television phone-in scandal resulting in Ofcom's subsequently fining ITV a record £5.675 million for its misuse of premium-rate telephone lines.

After Michael Parkinson presented the inaugural ceremony at the London Palladium in December 1990, the majority of subsequent shows were presented by Jonathan Ross, staged at London Studios, and produced by Michael Hurll Television (MHTV), whose parent company is Unique Communications Group. Ross did not present the 2008 awards, in light of The Russell Brand Show prank calls row and was replaced for that year by Angus Deayton.

The 2007 show occurred on 6 December 2007, but was not televised due to the 2005 controversy and subsequent investigations. The following years ceremony was shown live on 6 December 2008. Compliance for the show was the responsibility of the ITV Compliance Unit of ITV Network Limited (consisting of members from ITV plc, STV Group, UTV Media, and Channel Television Ltd).

In June 2010, it was announced that awards were to be broadcast on Channel 4 for three years, which was later extended for one more year. Shortly afterwards, the 2010 ceremony was postponed until it finally aired in January 2011. In June 2015 Channel 4 announced they would be dropping the ceremony.

Winners

1990
 Best new TV comedy: Drop the Dead Donkey
 Top TV comedy actor: David Jason
 Top TV comedy actress: Jean Boht
 Top TV comedy newcomer: Pauline Quirke
 Top British film actor: Griff Rhys Jones
 Top British film actress: Pauline Collins
 Top live stand up: Victoria Wood
 Top British TV comedy: A Bit of a Do
 Top ITV/C4 sitcom: A Bit of a Do
 Top BBC sitcom: Only Fools and Horses
 Top US sitcom: Cheers
 Top entertainment performer: Rowan Atkinson
 Top variety act: Russ Abbot
 Top comedy film: Shirley Valentine
 Top radio comedy: Victor Lewis-Smith
 Best stage comedy newcomer: Mike Doyle
 WGGB Award For Top Comedy Writer: David Nobbs
 Lifetime achievement award for stage: Norman Wisdom
 Lifetime achievement award for radio: Roy Hudd
 Lifetime achievement award for film comedy: Peter Rogers (Carry On films producer)
 Lifetime achievement award: Ronnie Barker

1991
 Best new TV comedy: Have I Got News for You
 Best TV comedy actor: Richard Wilson (One Foot in the Grave)
 Best TV comedy actress: Patricia Routledge
 Top TV comedy newcomer: Angus Deayton
 Best TV Entertainment presenter: Clive Anderson (Whose Line Is It Anyway)
 Best ITV/C4 sitcom: Drop The Dead Donkey
 Best entertainment series: Alas Smith and Jones
 Top entertainment presenter: Clive Anderson
 Top British entertainment performers: Mel Smith and Griff Rhys Jones
 Top variety performers: Vic Reeves and Bob Mortimer
 Best comedy film: Home Alone
 Best radio comedy: On The Hour/The Million Pound Radio Show
 Top radio comedy personality: Phil Holden
 Top stage newcomer: Jack Dee
 Top comedy club performer: Jeremy Hardy
 WGGB Award For Top Comedy Writer: John Sullivan
 Lifetime achievement: Beryl Reid
 International lifetime achievement: George Burns

1992
 Best new TV comedy: Bottom
 Best TV comedy actor: David Jason (The Darling Buds of May)
 Best TV comedy actress: Stephanie Cole (Waiting For God)
 Best TV comedy newcomer: Alan Cumming (Bernard and the Genie)
 Top TV comedy personality: Paul Merton
 Top variety performer: Les Dawson
 Best sitcom: One Foot in the Grave
 Best ITV comedy: Men Behaving Badly
 Best BBC sitcom: One Foot in the Grave
 Best C4 sitcom: Desmonds
 Best TV comedy drama: Murder Most Horrid
 Best C4 personality: Chris Evans
 Best comedy film: Hear My Song
 Top comedy club performer: Jo Brand
 WGGB Award For Top Comedy Writer: David Renwick
 Lifetime Achievement: Eric Sykes

1993
 Best new TV comedy: Absolutely Fabulous
 Best comedy actor: Rik Mayall (Rik Mayall Presents)
 Best comedy actress: Joanna Lumley (Absolutely Fabulous)
 Top TV comedy newcomer: Steve Coogan
 Top C4 entertainment presenter: Chris Evans
 Best radio comedy: Knowing Me, Knowing You
 Top variety entertainer: Ken Dodd
 Best entertainment series: Barrymore
 Best BBC sitcom: One Foot in the Grave
 Best ITV sitcom: Watching
 Best C4 sitcom: Drop The Dead Donkey
 Best TV comedy drama: The Snapper
 Top TV personality: Joanna Lumley
 Top female performer: Jennifer Saunders and Dawn French
 Best comedy film: Groundhog Day
 Top stand-up: Eddie Izzard
 WGGB Award For Top Comedy Writer: Richard Curtis
 Lifetime achievement award: Ken Dodd

1994
 Best comedy series: Murder Most Horrid
 Best new TV comedy: Knowing Me, Knowing You... with Alan Partridge
 Top TV comedy actor: Stephen Tompkinson (Drop The Dead Donkey)
 Top TV comedy actress: Brenda Blethyn (Outside Edge)
 Best TV comedy newcomer: Chris Morris (The Day Today)
 Best TV comedy series: Drop The Dead Donkey
 Best BBC comedy series: Red Dwarf
 Best C4 comedy: Drop The Dead Donkey
 Best ITV comedy: Time After Time
 Best comedy drama: Outside Edge
 Best male TV performer: Steve Coogan (Knowing Me, Knowing You... with Alan Partridge)
 Top female comedy performer: Tracey Ullman (Tracey Ullman Takes on New York)
 Best ITV entertainment presenter: Michael Barrymore
 Best BBC entertainment presenter: Noel Edmonds
 Best Channel 4 entertainment presenter: Chris Evans (Don't Forget Your Toothbrush)
 Top theatre variety performer: Billy Pearce
 Best comedy film: Four Weddings and a Funeral
 Top comedy writer: Jack Rosenthal
 Best radio comedy: A Look Back to the Future
 Best live stand-up: Phil Kay
 WGGB Award For Top Comedy Writer: Jack Rosenthal
 Special award for Comedy: Armando Iannucci
 Lifetime achievement: Spike Milligan, June Whitfield

1995
 Best comedy show: Rory Bremner Who Else
 Best new TV comedy: Father Ted
 Top TV comedy actor: Martin Clunes (Men Behaving Badly)
 Top TV comedy actress: Caroline Quentin (Men Behaving Badly)
 Top TV comedy newcomer: Ardal O'Hanlon (Father Ted)
 Top female comedy performer: Victoria Wood
 Top male comedy performers: John Bird and John Fortune
 Best radio comedy: I'm Sorry I Haven't A Clue
 Best BBC comedy series: One Foot in the Grave
 Best ITV entertainment presenter: Michael Barrymore
 Best BBC entertainment presenter: Noel Edmonds
 Best Channel 4 entertainment presenter: Chris Evans
 Top TV personality: Jack Dee
 Best ITV sitcom: Is It Legal?
 Best BBC sitcom: One Foot in the Grave
 Best Channel 4 sitcom: Drop The Dead Donkey
 Best comedy drama: Preston Front
 Best entertainment series: Don't Forget Your Toothbrush
 Best comedy film: Bullets Over Broadway
 Best stand-up comic: Jo Brand
 WGGB Award For Top Comedy Writer: Andy Hamilton and Guy Jenkin
 Lifetime achievement for variety: Bruce Forsyth
 Lifetime achievement for comedy: Bob Monkhouse
 Award for comedy: Peter Cook

1996
 Best comedy series: The Fast Show
 Best new TV comedy: Thin Blue Line
 Top TV comedy actor: Dermot Morgan (Father Ted)
 Top TV comedy actress: Pauline McLynn (Father Ted)
 Top TV newcomer: James Dreyfus (The Thin Blue Line)
 Best BBC sitcom: One Foot in the Grave
 Best ITV sitcom: The 10%ers
 Top ITV entertainment presenter: Cilla Black
 Top BBC1 entertainment presenter: Ruby Wax
 Top C4/BBC2 entertainment presenter: Chris Evans (TFI Friday)
 Best children's comedy: Woof!
 Top female comedy performer: Caroline Aherne (Mrs Merton)
 Top male comedy performer: Paul Whitehouse (The Fast Show)
 Best comedy film: Babe
 Best radio comedy: People Like Us
 Best comedy drama: Outside Edge
 Best entertainment series: TFI Friday
 International comedy: Frasier
 Top TV comedy personalities: Vic Reeves and Bob Mortimer
 Best stand-up: Eddie Izzard
 WGGB Award For Top Comedy Writer: Johnny Speight
 Lifetime achievement award: Dave Allen

1997
 Best comedy show: The Fast Show
 Best new TV comedy: The Harry Hill Show
 Best TV comedy actor: David Jason (Only Fools and Horses)
 Best TV comedy actress: Dawn French (Vicar of Dibley)
 Top comedy newcomer: Graham Norton
 Best C4 sitcom: Father Ted
 Top BBC1 personality: Caroline Aherne
 Top ITV personality: Cilla Black
 Top BBC2/C4 personality: Paul Whitehouse
 Best radio comedy: People Like Us
 Best comedy film: The Full Monty
 Cockburn's funniest comedy moment: Only Fools and Horses
 Best international comedy: The Larry Sanders show
 Best BBC sitcom: One Foot in the Grave Christmas Special
 Best ITV sitcom: Faith in the Future
 Best Channel 4 sitcom: Father Ted Christmas Special
 Best BBC comedy drama: The Missing Postman
 Best ITV comedy drama: Cold Feet
 Best children's comedy: My Dad's A Boring Nerd
 Best entertainment programme: An Evening With Lily Savage
 Top stand-up comic: Jack Dee
 People's Choice: Only Fools and Horses
 WGGB achievement award: Ray Galton and Alan Simpson
 Lifetime achievement award: Stanley Baxter

1998
 Best comedy series: Goodness Gracious Me
 Best new TV comedy: The Royle Family
 Best TV comedy actor: Steve Coogan (I'm Alan Partridge)
 Best TV comedy actress: Emma Chambers (Vicar of Dibley)
 Top TV comedy newcomer: Dylan Moran (How Do You Want Me?)
 Best TV sitcom: I'm Alan Partridge
 Best light entertainment series: Who Wants to Be a Millionaire?
 Top BBC1 comedy personality: Harry Enfield
 Top BBC2 personality: Steve Coogan
 Top ITV personality: Michael Barrymore
 Best children's comedy: Sooty & Co
 Best television comedy drama: Underworld
 Best comedy film: Lock Stock and Two Smoking Barrels
 Best radio comedy: Old Harry's Game
 Best stand-up comedian: Tommy Tiernan
 WGGB writer of the year award: Denis Norden and (posthumously) Frank Muir
 People's Choice: One Foot in the Grave
 Lifetime achievement award: Dame Thora Hird

1999
 Best new TV comedy: Dinnerladies
 Best TV comedy actor: Ricky Tomlinson (The Royle Family)
 Best TV comedy actress: Caroline Aherne (The Royle Family, Mrs Merton and Malcolm).
 Best male comedy newcomer: Sacha Baron Cohen (The 11 O'Clock Show)
 Best female comedy newcomer: Jessica Stevenson (Spaced, The Royle Family)
 Best comedy entertainment personality: Paul Merton
 Best 'broken comedy': Big Train
 Best comedy gameshow: Have I Got News for You
 Best comedy talkshow: So Graham Norton
 Best TV sitcom: The Royle Family
 Best TV comedy-drama: Cold Feet
 Best comedy film: Notting Hill
 Best international comedy show: The Larry Sanders Show
 Best comedy entertainment programme: Comic Relief
 Best radio comedy: The Sunday Format
 Best live stand-up: Bill Bailey
 WGGB Award For Top Comedy Writer: Richard Curtis
 Lifetime achievement award: Barry Humphries, The Two Ronnies

2000
 Best TV comedy: Dinnerladies
 Best new TV comedy: That Peter Kay Thing
 Best TV comedy actor: James Nesbitt (Cold Feet)
 Best TV comedy actress: Sue Johnston (The Royle Family)
 Best TV comedy newcomer: Rob Brydon (Marion and Geoff)
 Best TV comedy-drama: Cold Feet
 Best TV comedy personality: Graham Norton
 Best comedy entertainment programme: Alistair McGowan's Big Impression
 Best comedy film: East Is East
 Best international TV show: The Simpsons
 Best of British: The Vicar of Dibley
 Best live comic: Sean Lock
 People's Choice: SMTV Live
 WGGB writer of the year: Victoria Wood
 Lifetime achievement award: Alan Bennett

2001
 Best TV comedy: One Foot in the Grave
 Best new TV comedy: The Office
 Best TV comedy actor: Rob Brydon (Human Remains)
 Best TV comedy actress: Ronni Ancona
 Best comedy newcomer: Johnny Vegas
 Best comedy entertainment personality: Frank Skinner
 Best TV comedy drama: Bob and Rose
 Best comedy entertainment programme: So Graham Norton
 Best international comedy TV show: Seinfeld
 Best radio comedy: Dead Ringers
 Best comedy film: Best in Show
 Best live stand-up: Victoria Wood (Award not presented on night)
 The AOL people's choice: Cold Feet (Voted by viewing audience)
 Writer of the year: Russell T Davies
 Lifetime achievement award: David Jason

2002
 Best TV Comedy: The Office
 Best new TV comedy: The Kumars at No 42
 Best comedy actor: Ricky Gervais (The Office)
 Best comedy actress: Kathy Burke (Gimme Gimme Gimme)
 Best comedy newcomer: Kris Marshall (My Family)
 Best comedy entertainment Personality: Graham Norton
 Best comedy drama: Auf Wiedersehen, Pet
 Best comedy entertainment programme: V Graham Norton
 Best international comedy show: Six Feet Under
 Best comedy film: Bend It Like Beckham
 People's choice award: Peter Kay's Phoenix Nights
 Writer of the year: Peter Kay
 Lifetime achievement award: Michael Palin

2003
 Best TV comedy: Coupling
 Best new TV comedy: My New Best Friend
 Best comedy actor: Steve Coogan
 Best comedy actress: Ronni Ancona
 Best comedy newcomer: David Walliams (Little Britain)
 Best entertainment personality: Ant and Dec
 Best comedy drama: Cold Feet
 Best comedy entertainment programme: Friday Night with Jonathan Ross
 International comedy show: Malcolm in the Middle
 Best comedy film: Calendar Girls
 People's choice award: Ant and Dec's Saturday Night Takeaway
 Writer of the year: Mike Bullen
 Lifetime achievement award: Jimmy Perry and David Croft

2004
 Best TV comedy: Little Britain
 Best new TV comedy: Nighty Night
 Best TV comedy actor: Matt Lucas and David Walliams
 Best TV comedy actress: Caroline Quentin
 Best comedy newcomer: Catherine Tate
 Best comedy entertainment personality: Ant & Dec
 Best comedy entertainment programme: Ant & Dec's Saturday Night Takeaway
 Best TV comedy drama: Doc Martin
 Best international comedy show: The Simpsons
 Best comedy film: School of Rock
 People's choice award: Little Britain
 Writers of the Year: Ricky Gervais and Stephen Merchant
 Outstanding achievement: Matt Groening, French and Saunders

2005
 Best TV comedy: Little Britain
 Best new TV comedy: The Thick of It
 Best TV comedy actor: Chris Langham
 Best TV comedy actress: Ashley Jensen
 Best comedy newcomer: Ashley Jensen
 Best international Show: The Simpsons
 Best entertainment Programme: The X Factor
 Best comedy drama: Shameless
 Best comedy entertainment Personality: Paul O'Grady
 Best comedy film: Festival
 People's choice award: The Catherine Tate Show declared actual winner (2008); "mistakenly" awarded to Ant & Dec's Saturday Night Takeaway (2005)
 Ronnie Barker Writers of the year: Matt Lucas and David Walliams
 Outstanding achievement: Julie Walters and Victoria Wood

2006
 Best Comedy Entertainment Programme: Harry Hill's TV Burp
 Best Comedy Film: Wallace & Gromit: The Curse of the Were-Rabbit
 Best International Comedy TV Show: Curb Your Enthusiasm
 Britain's Best New TV Comedy: Star Stories
 Best TV Comedy: Peep Show
 Best Stage Comedy: Little Britain Live
 People's Choice Award: Ant and Dec's Saturday Night Takeaway
 Best TV Comedy Actor: Stephen Merchant
 Best TV Comedy Actress: Catherine Tate
 Best TV Comedy Entertainment Personality: Harry Hill
 Best Male Comedy Newcomer: Russell Brand
 Best Female Comedy Newcomer: Charlotte Church
 Best Live Standup Tour: Jimmy Carr
 Ronnie Barker Award: Sacha Baron Cohen, Peter Baynham, Anthony Hines, Dan Mazer
 Writers' Guild of Great Britain Special Award: Jonathan Ross
 Outstanding Contribution To Entertainment: Chris Tarrant

2007
 Best New Comedy Entertainment Programme: Al Murray's Happy Hour
 Best Comedy Film: The Simpsons Movie
 Best International Comedy TV Show: Curb Your Enthusiasm
 Britain's Best New TV Comedy: Gavin & Stacey
 Best TV Comedy: Peep Show
 Best TV Comedy Actor: David Mitchell (Peep Show)
 Best TV Comedy Actress: Liz Smith (The Royle Family: The Queen of Sheba)
 Best Comedy Entertainment Personality: Simon Amstell (Never Mind The Buzzcocks)
 Best Male Comedy Newcomer: James Corden
 Best Female Comedy Newcomer: Ruth Jones (Gavin & Stacey)
 Best Live Standup: Alan Carr
 Ronnie Barker Award: Simon Pegg
 British Comedy Lifetime Achievement Award: Stephen Fry

2008
 Best Comedy Entertainment Programme: Harry Hill's TV Burp
 Best Comedy Film: Hot Fuzz
 Britain's Best New British TV Comedy: The Inbetweeners
 Best TV Comedy: Gavin & Stacey
 Best TV Comedy Actor: Ricky Gervais (Extras)
 Best TV Comedy Actress: Sharon Horgan (Pulling)
 Best Comedy Entertainment Personality: Alan Carr (The Sunday Night Project)
 Best Male Comedy Newcomer: Simon Bird
 Best Female Comedy Newcomer: Katy Brand
 Best TV Comedy Drama: Drop Dead Gorgeous
 Best Live Standup Performer: Russell Brand
 Best Comedy Panel Show: QI
 Ronnie Barker Award: David Renwick
 British Comedy Lifetime Achievement Award: Jasper Carrott
 Outstanding Contribution to Comedy: Geoffrey Perkins

2009
 Best Comedy Entertainment Programme: Harry Hill's TV Burp
 Best Situation Comedy: Outnumbered
 Best New British TV Comedy: Psychoville
 Best Comedy Panel Show: Have I Got News for You
 Best TV Comedy Drama: Pulling Special
 Outstanding Contribution to British Comedy: Peter Kay
 Best Television Comedy Actress: Katherine Parkinson (The IT Crowd)
 Best Television Comedy Actor: Simon Bird (The Inbetweeners)
 Best Comedy Entertainment Personality: Harry Hill
 Ronnie Barker Award: Graham Linehan
 Best Comedy Film: In the Loop
 Best Live Standup Performer: Michael McIntyre
 Best British Comedy: Outnumbered
 British Lifetime Achievement Award: Terry Wogan
 Best Male Comedy Newcomer: Charlie Brooker (You Have Been Watching)
 Best Female Comedy Newcomer: Ramona Marquez (Outnumbered)
 Best Sketch Show: Harry and Paul

2010
 Best Comedy Entertainment Programme: Newswipe
 Best Comedy Panel Show: Would I Lie To You?
 Best Comedy Entertainment Personality: Harry Hill
 Best Male TV Comic: Michael McIntyre
 Best Female TV Comic: Jo Brand
 British Comedy Academy Lifetime Achievement Award: Roy Clarke
 Best New British TV Comedy: Miranda
 Best Male Comedy Breakthrough Artist: John Bishop
 Best Female Comedy Breakthrough Artist: Samantha Spiro (Grandma's House)
 Best Sketch Show: Horrible Histories
 Best Sitcom: The Inbetweeners
 Writers' Guild of Great Britain Award: Sam Bain and Jesse Armstrong
 Best TV Comedy Actor: Peter Capaldi
 Best TV Comedy Actress: Miranda Hart
 Best Comedy Performance in a British Film: Kayvan Novak
 People's Choice Award for the King Or Queen of Comedy 2010: Miranda Hart

2011
 Best Comedy Entertainment Programme: Stewart Lee's Comedy Vehicle
 Best Comedy Panel Show: Shooting Stars
 Best Comedy Entertainment Personality: Graham Norton
 Best Male TV Comic: Stewart Lee
 Best Female TV Comic: Victoria Wood
 British Comedy Academy Lifetime Achievement Award: Have I Got News For You
 Best New Comedy Programme: Fresh Meat
 Best Sketch Show: Horrible Histories
 Best Sitcom: Twenty Twelve
 Best Comedy Drama: Psychoville
 British Comedy Academy Outstanding Achievement: The Inbetweeners
 Best Comedy Breakthrough Artist: Angelos Neil Epithemiou
 Writers' Guild of Great Britain Award: Armando Iannucci
 Best TV Comedy Actor: Darren Boyd
 Best TV Comedy Actress: Miranda Hart
 People's Choice Award for the King or Queen of Comedy 2011: Sarah Millican
 Channel 4 Award for Special Contribution to Comedy: Lee Evans

2012
 Best Comedy Entertainment Personality: Charlie Brooker
 Best Sitcom: Hunderby
 Best Male Television Comic: Lee Mack
 Best Comedy Entertainment Programme: Harry Hill's TV Burp
 Best Comedy Breakthrough Artist: Morgana Robinson
 Best TV Comedy Actress: Rebecca Front
 Best New Comedy Programme: Hunderby
 Best Female Television Comic: Jo Brand
 Best Sketch Show: Cardinal Burns
 People's Choice Award for the King or Queen of Comedy 2012: Jack Whitehall
 Writers' Guild Award:  Reeves and Mortimer
 Best TV Comedy Actor: Peter Capaldi
 British Comedy Academy Outstanding Achievement Award: Sacha Baron Cohen

2013
The 2013 awards were presented at a two-hour ceremony hosted by Jonathan Ross on 12 December and shown live on Channel 4.
 Best Comedy Panel Show: Would I Lie to You?
 Best Comedy Entertainment Personality: Alan Carr
 Best Sitcom: Getting On
 Best Male Television Comic: Lee Mack
 Best Comedy Entertainment Programme: The Graham Norton Show
 Best Comedy Breakthrough Artist: Adam Hills
 Best TV Comedy Actress:  Miranda Hart
 Best New Comedy Programme: Plebs
 Best Female Television Comic: Nina Conti
 Best Sketch Show: Harry & Paul
 People's Choice Award for the King or Queen of Comedy 2013: Jack Whitehall
 Writers' Guild Award: Paul Whitehouse
 Best TV Comedy Actor: Jack Whitehall
 British Comedy Academy Outstanding Achievement Award: Steve Coogan
 British Comedy International Achievement: Will Ferrell

2014
 Best TV Comedy Actress: Katherine Parkinson
 Best Comedy Film: The Inbetweeners 2
 Best Male Television Comic: Lee Mack
 Best Sketch Show: Harry and Paul's Story of the Twos
 Best Female Television Comic: Aisling Bea
 Best Comedy Entertainment Personality: Graham Norton
 Best TV Comedy Actor: Harry Enfield
 Best Comedy Drama: Rev
 Best New Comedy Programme: Toast of London
 Best Comedy Panel Programme: Would I Lie to You?
 Best Sitcom: Moone Boy
 King of Comedy: Jack Whitehall
 Best Comedy Breakthrough Artist: Nick Helm
 Best Comedy Entertainment Programme: The Graham Norton Show
 The Writers' Guild Award of Great Britain: Brendan O'Carroll
 British Comedy Academy Outstanding Achievement Award: Monty Python
 Best Internet Comedy Short: Carpark
 Best International Comedy Programme: Modern Family

National Comedy Awards (2022–)
In August 2020, Channel 4 announced the launch of the National Comedy Awards, a new annual awards ceremony event with multiple categories all decided by a public vote. Produced in collaboration with Hungry Bear Media, the awards ceremony is linked to Channel 4's Stand Up to Cancer charity drive, with comedy fans being encouraged to donate in order to help accelerate life-saving research. Phil Harris, Channel 4's head of entertainment, said: "This is an award show for our times. Fans will be able to vote on the people, some established and others less so, who really make them laugh. We will be celebrating some incredible comedy talent while supporting the incredible Stand Up to Cancer. It promises to be a very special night of TV."

Aiming to celebrate "the UK's most brilliant comedy content and creators", the first ceremony was due to be held in the Spring of 2021 but was postponed due to the COVID-19 pandemic, with the new date of on 15 December 2021 being set by Hungry Bear Media and Channel 4. The first ceremony was due to be held at the Roundhouse in London, with Channel 4 due to broadcast the event two days later as part of their Friday night comedy line-up. Due to the ongoing pandemic and concerns over the Omicron variant, the show was cancelled by the organisers a week before it was due to be staged and Channel 4 said that it would be rescheduled for another time.

The ceremony was finally held on 2 March 2022 and broadcast on Channel 4 three days later. The ceremony was hosted by comedian Tom Allen, with presenters including Matt Lucas, Jessica Hynes, Al Murray and Meera Syal. It included a tribute to Sean Lock.

Ceremonies

Categories

Awards

2022

2023

Controversies

Investigation of alleged irregularities and deception
At the 2005 ceremony, the wrong show received the People's Choice Award. The award was "mistakenly given" to Ant & Dec's Saturday Night Takeaway even though The Catherine Tate Show received the most tabulated votes and should have been declared the winner, and Ant & Dec were asked to return their 2005 award.

Charged by the awards show with investigating the allegations of irregularities, the independent law firm Olswang summarized its findings as follows: "Robbie Williams was invited to present an award. It was understood that he would be happy [to do so] if the recipients were Ant McPartlin and Declan Donnelly. In order to ensure his attendance, this assurance was given.  But it could not be definitively established that Williams' involvement led to the wrong winner being announced" [italics added].

Saturday Night Takeaway did, however, receive the People's Choice Award at the British Comedy Awards 2006.

Phone-in scandal
Beginning on 26 July 2007, British tabloid newspapers reported the alleged involvement of the British Comedy Awards in the 2007 British television phone-in scandal. ITV announced that they postponed the British Comedy Awards 2007 due to the voting irregularities.  In a statement, the company said: "Pending conclusion of the investigation, broadcast of the British Comedy Awards 2007 will be postponed. ... ITV will not make any further comment regarding this matter until the conclusion of the investigation."

It was announced on 21 September 2007 that the British Comedy Awards 2007 would not be screened by ITV1; however, it was not confirmed then that the Awards would still take place in December, and it was not ruled out that they could be screened by another channel. The 2007 awards did take place on 5 December 2007, but that show was not televised. In early May 2008 Ofcom announced its fining and sanctioning ITV plc in a press release.

On 15 August 2008, it was announced that a similar scandal could have been committed in the award ceremony at the 2004 Awards.

Following the Russell Brand Show prank calls row and his 12-week unpaid suspension from all of his BBC shows, Jonathan Ross resigned from presenting the 2008 awards, in agreement with ITV, as he did not want to "take away from the awards themselves or the many talented winners of the awards." Angus Deayton replaced Jonathan Ross as the host of the British Comedy Awards. Ross returned to presenting the awards in 2009.

Ratings 
Ratings from BARB.

See also
British Comedy Guide Awards
Edinburgh Comedy Awards
Comic's Choice

References

External links

 British Comedy Awards – Official website hosted by Unique Communications Group, the parent company of British Comedy Awards producer Michael Hurll Television (MHTV); site provides annual lists of winners.
 The National Comedy Awards – Official website
 
 

1990 British television series debuts
2014 British television series endings
2022 British television series debuts
British comedy and humour awards
ITV comedy
Channel 4 comedy
British television awards
Lifetime achievement awards
1990 establishments in the United Kingdom
2014 disestablishments in the United Kingdom
2022 establishments in the United Kingdom
Awards established in 1990
Awards disestablished in 2014
Awards established in 2022
Annual events in the United Kingdom